Nicephorus served as Greek Patriarch of Alexandria between 1639 and 1645.

References
 

17th-century Greek Patriarchs of Alexandria
17th-century people from the Ottoman Empire